The Bosnia and Herzegovina football league system is a series of connected leagues for football clubs in Bosnia and Herzegovina. The system is hierarchical, with promotion and relegation between leagues at different levels. The top division is organized by the Football Association of Bosnia and Herzegovina, the second and third levels by entity associations, and lower levels by cantonal or regional associations.

Structure
The Premier League of Bosnia and Herzegovina is at the top of the structure. It is the top flight in Bosnian club football and has 12 teams. The League champion is also the champion of Bosnia and Herzegovina and has the right to play in the UEFA Champions League qualifying rounds. The bottom two teams of the table are relegated to the second level of the competition.

The second tier is divided into two leagues – the First League of the Federation of Bosnia and Herzegovina and the First League of the Republika Srpska – containing, respectively, 16 and 10 clubs. Relegated teams from the Premier League are demoted to the second-level competition in the next season. Geographical location is the criterion for decided decision in which one of these two leagues the teams will play. The winner of each league is promoted to the Premier League, and the bottom teams are relegated. The number of relegated teams depends on how many teams enter from the Premier League and the Third Divisions.

Third-level football is even more dispersed. Each league is associated with a different geographical area. In the Federation of Bosnia and Herzegovina, there are four second divisions, and in Republika Srpska two second divisions. The same principle of promotion and relegation is used, so the league winners are promoted to the appropriate second-level league, and clubs at the bottom of the table are relegated to the lower levels.

There are cantonal football associations in nine of the ten cantons which make up the Federation of Bosnia and Herzegovina. They each organize clubs into one or more leagues, depending on the number of clubs they control. In Republika Srpska, which has no cantons, there are instead four football regions, each of which has a league. The first leagues in the Federation cantons and the regional leagues in Republika Srpska constitute the fourth level of club football.

Further down, there are many different types of organization. Some cantons (with many clubs) have second leagues, and there are also municipality and inter-municipality leagues for clubs not associated with any cantonal or regional league.

System

List of clubs (2020–21)

(I) - Premier League of Bosnia and Herzegovina (12 clubs)

(II) - First League of the Federation of the Bosnia and Herzegovina (16 clubs)

(II) - First League of the Republika Srpska (16 clubs)

(III) - Second League of the Federation of Bosnia and Herzegovina - North (16 clubs)

Cup competition 
The Bosnia and Herzegovina Football Cup usually starts in spring with qualification matches. Those matches are played between lower league clubs on canton (Federation of Bosnia and Herzegovina) or region (Republika Srpska) level. Best teams qualify to entity cups which are qualifying competitions for the national cup.

In the first round of the national cup, 12 Premier League teams are joined by 12 teams from the First League of FBiH and 8 teams from the First League of RS.

References

       
Bosnia and Herzegovina